The Nathan Fisher House is a historic house in Westborough, Massachusetts.

Description and history 
The wood frame Federal style house was built c. 1820 by Nathan Fisher, who had married into the locally prominent Lothrop family. Fisher operated a store, which fell into decline after the area was bypassed by the railroad in 1834. Next to the house was also built a thread factory (no longer standing) where the first steam power was used in Westborough. The property was purchased by the state in 1884 and became part of the (now closed) Lyman School for Boys.

The house was listed on the National Register of Historic Places in 1980, and included in the historic district encompassing the Lyman School in 1994.

See also
 National Register of Historic Places listings in Worcester County, Massachusetts

References

Houses in Worcester County, Massachusetts
Houses completed in 1820
Buildings and structures in Westborough, Massachusetts
Houses on the National Register of Historic Places in Worcester County, Massachusetts
Historic district contributing properties in Massachusetts
Federal architecture in Massachusetts